"Great Train Robbery" is a song by Jamaican reggae group Black Uhuru. It was recorded at Music Mountain Studios in Kingston, Jamaica, and released as a single of their studio album Brutal via Real Authentic Sound in 1986. Production was handled by Doctor Dread and Arthur Baker. The single peaked at number 31 in New Zealand, number 49 in the Netherlands, number 62 in the United Kingdom, and was featured in the 2004 video game Grand Theft Auto: San Andreas on its fictional reggae radio station K-JAH West.

Track listing

Personnel 
 Delroy "Junior" Reid – lyrics, vocals
 Sandra Jones – backing vocals
 Derrick "Duckie" Simpson – backing vocals
 Ira Siegel – guitar
 Robert Warren Dale Shakespeare – bass
 Anthony Brissett – piano
 Jeffrey S. Bova – synthesizer
 Lowell Fillmore Dunbar – drums
 Bashiri Johnson – timbales & percussion
 Arthur Henry Baker – effects, producer, mixing, re-mixing
 Gary Himelfarb – producer
 Dave O'grin – engineering, mixing
 Conrad Malcolm – engineering, recording
 Don Grossinger – mastering
 Aldo Marin – editor
 Kelly Lee – artwork
 Tommy Noonan – photography

Chart positions

References

External links 

1986 songs
1986 singles
Reggae songs
Song recordings produced by Arthur Baker (musician)